Simone Giordano (born 21 December 2001) is an Italian professional footballer who plays as a left-back or left midfielder for  club Ascoli, on loan from Sampdoria.

Personal life
Giordano was born in Genoa.

Club career

Sampdoria

With Sampdoria U19 he reached the historic first place in the Primavera 1 championship in the season 2020/2021, providing 2 goals and 11 assists.
On 2020, he signed his first professional deal with the club, bonding until 2024.
In 2022, he renews the contract until 2026.

Piacenza
In June 2021 he was sent on loan to Piacenza Calcio making his debut on 22 August 2021 against A.C. Reggiana 1919.
He scores his first goal with Piacenza Calcio  on March 17 against third-placed Renate.
He plays the championship as a protagonist, reaching the play-off goal for qualifying for Serie B. 
He ends the season with 35 appearances, 1 goal and 7 assists.

Ascoli
On 4 July 2022, his loan to Ascoli in Serie B was made official.
The first match of the season in the Italian Cup against Venice on 7 August 2022 makes his debut with Ascoli. 
He made his Serie B debut against Ternana by winning 2-1 on August 14, 2022.

Technical characteristics
He can play the roles of left-back or left midfielder and is an intelligent, precise player with good vision.
He is the youngest Sampdoria player to make his debut in the Primavera 1 championship (15 years and 8 months).

Natural left, with good use of the weak foot. He has very good technical and ballistic skills. It represents a decent factor on set pieces and, in addition, a good ability to kick and cross both standing and running. Smooth running with the ball.

Career statistics

Club

References

External links 
 

2001 births
Living people
Italian footballers
U.C. Sampdoria players
Ascoli Calcio 1898 F.C. players
Piacenza Calcio 1919 players
Association football midfielders
Serie C players
Serie B players